The Sadducees were a socio-religious sect of Jewish people who were active in Judea during the Second Temple period, from the second century BCE through the destruction of the  Temple in 70 CE. The Sadducees are often compared to other contemporaneous sects, including the Pharisees and the Essenes.

Josephus, writing at the end of the 1st century CE, associates the sect with the upper social and economic echelon of Judean society. As a whole, they fulfilled various political, social, and religious roles, including maintaining the Temple in Jerusalem. The group became extinct some time after the destruction of Herod's Temple in Jerusalem in 70 CE.

Etymology 
According to Abraham Geiger, the Sadducee sect of Judaism derived their name (Greek: Saddoukaioi; Hebrew: ṣāddūqim) from that of Zadok, the first High Priest of ancient Israel in the time of Solomon to serve in the First Temple; the leaders of the sect were proposed as the Kohanim (priests, the "Sons of Zadok", descendants of Eleazar, son of Aaron). The name Zadok is related to the root ,  (to be right, just), which could be indicative of their aristocratic status in society in the initial period of their existence.

In the Talmud (Ab., I, 3), the story is told of the two disciples of Antigonus of Sokho, Zadok and Boethus, who misunderstood the true ethical value of Antigonus's teaching. The two sects of the Zadokites (Sadducees) and Boethusians are thus, in all later Rabbinic sources, always mentioned together, not only as being similar, but as originating at the same time. 

Flavius Josephus mentions in Antiquities of the Jews that "one Judas, a Gaulonite, of a city whose name was Gamala, who taking with him Sadduc, a Pharisee, became zealous to draw them to a revolt". Paul L. Maier suggests that the sect drew their name from the Sadduc mentioned by Josephus.

History

The Second Temple period 

The Second Temple period is the period between the construction of the Second Temple in Jerusalem in 516 BCE and its destruction by the Romans in 70 CE.

Throughout the Second Temple period, Jerusalem saw several shifts in rule. Alexander's conquest of the Mediterranean world brought an end to Persian control of Jerusalem (539–334/333 BCE) and ushered in the Hellenistic period. The Hellenistic period, which extended from 334/333 BCE to 63 BCE, is known today for the spread of Hellenistic influence.

After the death of Alexander in 323 BCE, his generals divided the empire amongst themselves, and for the next 30 years they fought for control of the empire. Judea was first controlled by the Ptolemies of Egypt and later by the Seleucids of Syria. King Antiochus Epiphanes of Syria, a Seleucid, disrupted whatever peace there had been in Judea when he desecrated the temple in Jerusalem and forced Jews to violate the Torah. Most prominent of the rebel groups were the Maccabees, led by Mattathias the Hasmonean and his son Judah the Maccabee. Though the Maccabees rebelled against the Seleucids in 164 BCE, Seleucid rule did not end for another 20 years. 

The Maccabean ( Hasmonean) rule lasted until 63 BCE, when the Roman general Pompey conquered Jerusalem, at which point the Roman period of Judea began, leading to the creation of the province of Roman Judea in 6 CE and (see Syria Palaestina) extending into the 7th century CE – well beyond the end of the Second Temple period. While cooperation between the Romans and the Jews had been strongest during the reigns of Herod and his grandson, Herod Agrippa I, the Romans moved power out of the hands of vassal kings and into the hands of Roman administrators, beginning with the Census of Quirinius in 6 CE. The First Jewish–Roman War broke out in 66 CE. After a few years of conflict, the Romans retook Jerusalem and destroyed the temple, bringing an end to the Second Temple period in 70 CE.

Role of the Temple 
During the Persian period, the Temple became more than the center of worship in Judea; following its reconstruction in 516 BCE, it served as the center of society. It makes sense, then, that priests held important positions as official leaders outside of the Temple. The democratizing forces of the Hellenistic period lessened and shifted the focus of Judaism away from the Temple, and in the 3rd century BCE a scribal class began to emerge.

It was also during this time that the high priesthood of Israel, often referred to as the Sadducees (although not all Sadducees were priests), was developing a reputation for corruption. Questions about the legitimacy of the Second Temple and its Sadducaic leadership freely circulated within Judean society. Sects began to form during the Maccabean reign (see Jewish sectarianism below). The Temple in Jerusalem was the formal center of political and governmental leadership in ancient Israel, although its power was often contested and disputed by fringe groups.

After the Temple destruction
After the destruction of the Temple of Jerusalem in 70 CE, the Sadducees appear only in a few references in the Talmud and in some Christian texts. In the beginnings of Karaism, the followers of Anan ben David were called "Sadducees" and set a claim of the former being a historical continuity from the latter.

The Sadducee concept of the mortality of the soul is reflected on by Uriel Acosta, who mentions them in his writings.

Role of the Sadducees

Religious
The religious responsibilities of the Sadducees included the maintenance of the Temple in Jerusalem. Their high social status was reinforced by their priestly responsibilities, as mandated in the Torah. The priests were responsible for performing sacrifices at the Temple, the primary method of worship in ancient Israel. This included presiding over sacrifices during the three festivals of pilgrimage to Jerusalem. Their religious beliefs and social status were mutually reinforcing, as the priesthood often represented the highest class in Judean society.  However, Sadducees and the priests were not completely synonymous. Cohen writes that "not all priests, high priests, and aristocrats were Sadducees; many were Pharisees, and many were not members of any group at all."

Political
The Sadducees oversaw many formal affairs of the state. Members of the Sadducees:
 Administered the state domestically
 Represented the state internationally
 Participated in the Sanhedrin, and often encountered the Pharisees there.
 Collected taxes. These also came in the form of international tribute from Jews in the Diaspora.
 Equipped and led the army
 Regulated relations with the Roman Empire
 Mediated domestic grievances.

Beliefs
Knowledge about the beliefs of the Sadducees is limited by the fact that not a single line of their own writings survived out of antiquity, as the destruction of Jerusalem and much of the Judean elite in 70 CE seems to have broken them.  The writings we do have on the Sadducees is often from sources hostile to them; Josephus was a rival Pharisee, Christian records were generally not sympathetic, and the rabbinic tradition (descended from the Pharisees) is uniformly hostile.

General 
The Sadducees rejected the Oral Torah as proposed by the Pharisees. Rather, they saw the Written Torah as the sole source of divine authority.  Later Pharisee writings criticized this belief as one that strengthened the Sadducees' own power.

According to Josephus, the Sadducees believed that:
 They rejected the idea of fate or a pre-ordained future.
 God does not commit or even think evil.
 Man has free will; "man has the free choice of good or evil".
 The soul is not immortal; there is no afterlife, and no rewards or penalties after death.
 They consider it a virtue to debate and dispute with philosophy teachers.

The Sadducees did not believe in resurrection of the dead, but believed (contrary to the claim of Josephus) in the traditional Jewish concept of Sheol for those who had died.  Josephus also includes a claim that the Sadducees are rude compared to loving and compassionate Pharisees, but this is generally considered more of a sectarian insult rather than an unbiased judgment of the Sadducees on their own terms.  Similarly, Josephus brags that the Sadducees were often forced to back down if their judgments clashed with the Pharisees, as he says that the Pharisees were more popular with the multitude.

The Sadducees occasionally show up in the Christian gospels, but without much detail: usually merely as parts of a list of opponents of Jesus.  The Christian Acts of the Apostles contains somewhat more information:
 The Sadducees were associated with the party of the high priest of the era, and seem to have had a majority of the Sanhedrin, if not all (Gamaliel is a Pharisee member).
 The Sadducees did not believe in resurrection, whereas the Pharisees did. In Acts, Paul of Tarsus chose this point of division to attempt to gain the protection of the Pharisees (around ~59 CE).
 The Sadducees rejected the notion of spirits or angels, whereas the Pharisees acknowledged them.

Disputes with the Pharisees 
 According to the Sadducees, spilt water became impure through its pouring. The Pharisees denied that this was sufficient grounds for  "impurity".
  According to the Jewish laws of inheritance, the property of a deceased man is inherited by his sons, but if the man had only daughters, his property is inherited by his daughters upon his death (Numbers 27:8). The Sadducees, however, in defiance of Jewish tradition, whenever dividing the inheritance among the relatives of the deceased, such as when the deceased left no issue, would perfunctorily seek for familial ties, regardless and irrespective of gender, so that the near of kin to the deceased and who inherits his property could, hypothetically, be his paternal aunt. The Sadducees would justify their practice by A fortiori, an inference from minor to major premise, saying:  "If the daughter of his son's son can inherit him (i.e. such as when her father left no male issue), is it not then fitting that his own daughter inherit him?!" (i.e. who is more closely related to him than his great granddaughter). Rabban Yohanan ben Zakkai tore down their argument, saying that the only reason the daughter was empowered to inherit her father was because her father left no male issue. However, a man's daughter – where there are sons, has no power to inherit her father's estate. Moreover, a deceased man who leaves no issue has always a distant male relative, unto whom is given his estate. The Sadducees eventually agreed with the Pharisaic teaching. The vindication of Rabban Yohanan ben Zakkai and the Pharisees over the Sadducees gave rise to this date being held in honor in the Scroll of Fasting.
 The Sadducees demanded that a master pay for damages caused by his slave. The Pharisees imposed no such obligation, viewing that a slave could intentionally cause damage in order to see the liability for it brought on his master.
 The Pharisees posited that false witnesses should be executed if the verdict was pronounced on the basis of their testimony—even if not yet actually carried out. The Sadducees argued that false witnesses should be executed only if the death penalty had already been carried out on the falsely accused.

Jewish sectarianism

The Jewish community of the Second Temple period is often defined by its sectarian and fragmented attributes. Josephus, in Antiquities, contextualizes the Sadducees as opposed to the Pharisees and the Essenes. The Sadducees are also notably distinguishable from the growing Jesus movement, which later evolved into Christianity. These groups differed in their beliefs, social statuses, and sacred texts. Though the Sadducees produced no primary works themselves, their attributes can be derived from other contemporaneous texts, including the New Testament, the Dead Sea Scrolls, and later, the Mishnah and Talmud. Overall, the Sadducees represented an aristocratic, wealthy, and traditional elite within the hierarchy.

Opposition to the Essenes
The Dead Sea Scrolls, which are often attributed to the Essenes, suggest clashing ideologies and social positions between the Essenes and the Sadducees. In fact, some scholars suggest that the Essenes originated as a sect of Zadokites, which would indicate that the group itself had priestly, and thus Sadducaic origins. Within the Dead Sea Scrolls, the Sadducees are often referred to as Manasseh. The scrolls suggest that the Sadducees (Manasseh) and the Pharisees (Ephraim) became religious communities that were distinct from the Essenes, the true Judah. Clashes between the Essenes and the Sadducees are depicted in the Pesher on Nahum, which states "They [Manasseh] are the wicked ones ... whose reign over Israel will be brought down ... his wives, his children, and his infant will go into captivity. His warriors and his honored ones [will perish] by the sword." The reference to the Sadducees as those who reign over Israel corroborates their aristocratic status as opposed to the more fringe group of Essenes. Furthermore, it suggests that the Essenes challenged the authenticity of the rule of the Sadducees, blaming the downfall of ancient Israel and the siege of Jerusalem on their impiety. The Dead Sea Scrolls specify the Sadducaic elite as those who broke the covenant with God in their rule of the Judean state, and thus became targets of divine vengeance.

Opposition to the early Christian church

The New Testament, specifically the books of Mark and Matthew, describe anecdotes which hint at hostility between Jesus and the Sadducaic establishment.  A pericope in Mark 12 and Matthew 22 recounts a dispute between Jesus and a Sadducee who challenged the resurrection of the dead by asking who the husband of a resurrected woman would be who had been married to each of seven brothers at one point.  Jesus responds by saying that the resurrected "neither marry nor are given in marriage, but are like angels in heaven."  He also insults them on their own terms as knowing neither the scriptures nor the power of God, presumably a claim that despite the Sadducee insistence on the written law, Jesus considered them getting it wrong regardless.

Matthew records John the Baptist calling both the Pharisees and Sadducees a "brood of vipers".

Opposition to the Pharisees
Josephus, the author of the most extensive historical account of the Second Temple Period, gives a lengthy account of Jewish sectarianism in both The Jewish War and Jewish Antiquities. In Antiquities, he describes "the Pharisees have delivered to the people a great many observances by succession from their fathers, which are not written in the law of Moses, and for that reason it is that the Sadducees reject them and say that we are to esteem those observance to be obligatory which are in the written word, but are not to observe what are derived from the tradition of our forefathers." The Sadducees rejected the Pharisaic use of the Oral Torah to enforce their claims to power, citing the Written Torah as the sole manifestation of divinity.

The rabbis, who are traditionally seen as the descendants of the Pharisees, describe the similarities and differences between the two sects in Mishnah Yadaim. The Mishnah explains that the Sadducees state, "So too, regarding the Holy Scriptures, their impurity is according to (our) love for them. But the books of Homer, which are not beloved, do not defile the hands." A passage from the book of Acts suggests that both Pharisees and Sadducees collaborated in the Sanhedrin, the high Jewish court.

Comparison 
A loose comparison of the ideologies of the Jewish sects of the post-Hasmonean Second Temple period:

References

Primary

Secondary

External links
 
 "SADDUCEES" by Kaufmann Kohler from the Jewish Encyclopedia (1901-1906)
 Two entries from Encyclopedia.com (The first is "Sadducees" from the Encyclopedia of Religion by Lawrence H. Schiffman; The second is "Sadducees" from the Encyclopaedia Judaica by Menahem Mansoor)
 Mishnah Yadayim 4:6–8, The Pharisee–Sadducee Debate, COJS.

2nd-century BCE Judaism
1st-century BCE Judaism
1st-century Judaism
Jewish religious movements
Judaism-related controversies
Israelites
Extinct religious groups